Cao Phong may refer to several places in Vietnam, including:

 Cao Phong District, a rural district of Hòa Bình Province
 Cao Phong, Hòa Bình, a township and capital of Cao Phong District
 , a rural commune of Sông Lô District.